The Declaration of the Clergy of France was a four-article document of the 1681 assembly of the French clergy. Promulgated in 1682, it codified the principles of Gallicanism into a system for the first time into an official and definitive formula.

Background
The 1516 Concordat of Bologna between the Holy See and the Kingdom of France repealed and explicitly superseded the 1438 Pragmatic Sanction of Bourges and was confirmed by the contemporaneous Fifth Lateran Council. Under the terms of the concordat, the election of bishops by canons and abbots by monks was discontinued; the right of presentation of a candidate for appointment as a bishop, abbot, or prior was conceded to the king and the right of confirmation of a candidate, right of devolution, and the right of reservation were conceded to the pope.
Since he had to present a suitable and qualified candidate, "the king's choice was not to be purely arbitrary".
The concordat also stipulated annates and other matters.

In 1663, the College of Sorbonne solemnly declared that it admitted no authority of the pope over the king's temporal dominion, his superiority to a general council or infallibility apart from the Church's consent.

In 1673, King Louis XIV of France, an absolute monarch, extended the  throughout the Kingdom of France. Under Louis XIV, the claims to appropriate revenues of vacant episcopal sees and to make appointments to benefices were vigorously enforced. The  were pleased and most bishops yielded without serious protest. Only two prelates, Nicolas Pavillon, bishop of Alet, and François de Caulet, bishop of Pamiers, both Jansenists, resisted the royal encroachment. Both unsuccessfully appealed to their metropolitan archbishop, who sided with Louis XIV, and they appealed to Pope Innocent XI in 1677.

In three successive papal briefs Innocent XI urged Louis XIV not to extend the right to dioceses that had previously been exempt, sustaining them with all his authority.

It was presided over by François de Harlay de Champvallon, archbishop of Paris, and Charles Maurice Le Tellier, archbishop of Reims.
Louis XIV then asked them to pronounce upon the authority of the pope and the Assembly again sided with the king.

Four articles

The four articles were drafted by Charles Maurice Le Tellier, archbishop of Reims; Gilbert de Choiseul Duplessis Praslin, bishop of Tournai; and Jacques-Bénigne Bossuet, bishop of Meaux. Those article are called the Four Gallican Articles. According to Antoine Dégert, in Catholic Encyclopedia, the doctrines of the four articles are the following:

According to the Gallican theory, then, papal primacy was limited by:

the temporal power of princes, which, by the Divine will, was inviolable
the authority of the general council and that of the bishops, who alone could, by their assent, give to his decrees that infallible authority which, of themselves, they lacked
the canons and customs of particular Churches, which the pope was bound to take into account when he exercised his authority

There were two types of Gallicanism:

Episcopal and political Gallicanism which lessened the doctrinal authority of the pope in favor of that of the bishops, to the degree marked by the Declaration of the clergy of France.
Parliamentary and judicial Gallicanism which augmented the rights of the State to the prejudice of those of the Church, on the grounds of what was called "the liberties of the Gallican Church" which affected the relations of temporal and spiritual powers. The four articles in the Declaration of the clergy of France were incorporated into this larger previously compiled collection.

Parliamentary Gallicanism was of much wider scope than episcopal and was often disavowed by the bishops of France. W. Henley Jervis wrote, in The Gallican Church, that Gallicanism preceded Louis XIV and it did not originate with the Declaration of the clergy of France, nor was it created by the Concordat of Bologna or the Pragmatic Sanction of Bourges.

Status
Louis XIV ordered the Declaration of the Clergy of France to be promulgated from all the pulpits of France. He commanded the registration of the four articles in all the schools and faculties of theology. No one could even be admitted to degrees in theology without maintaining the doctrine in one of his theses, and it was forbidden to write anything against the four articles.

Although it initially resisted, the Sorbonne yielded to the ordinance of registration.

The Jansenist Antoine Arnauld, who was then a refugee at Brussels, Spanish Netherlands, agreed with the doctrine of the four articles and wrote to dissuade Innocent XI from publishing any formal censure of the four articles. Arnauld surmised that a papal denunciation of the four articles would precipitate an "immense advantage into the hands of heretics, to make the Roman Church odious, to raise up obstacles to the conversion of Protestants, and to provoke a still more cruel persecution of the poor Catholics in England".

Pope Innocent XI hesitated to censure its publication. The consequence was that a provision of the Concordat of Bologna was applied by Innocent XI and remained so until the reconciliation between the French court and Holy See in 1693. Meanwhile, the candidates nominated for episcopal sees by Louis XIV enjoyed their revenues and temporal prerogatives but were incapable, according to the terms of the Concordat of Bologna and Catholic doctrine, of executing any part of the spiritual functions of the episcopate. At least 35 dioceses, nearly a third of all dioceses in the kingdom, were without canonically instituted bishops.

The apostolic constitution  promulgated by Pope Alexander VIII in 1690 and published in 1691, quashed the entire proceedings of the 1681 Assembly and declared that the Declaration of the Clergy of France was null, void and invalid.

On September 14, 1693, Louis XIV rescinded the four articles and "wrote a letter of retraction" to Pope Innocent XII.

The members of the 1681 Assembly who were presented as candidates for vacant sees and were refused papal confirmation of their appointment received confirmation in 1693 only after they had disavowed everything that the 1681 Assembly had decreed regarding ecclesiastical power and pontifical authority.

Nevertheless, according to Dégert, the Declaration of the Clergy of France remained "the living symbol of Gallicanism" that was professed by the majority of the French clergy that defended in the faculties of theology, schools, and seminaries, and French  suppressed works that seemed to be hostile to the four articles principles. Those ideas were later expressed during the French Revolution in the Civil Constitution of the Clergy in 1790.

See also
Synod of Pistoia
Auctorem fidei

Notes

Citations

References

Further reading

Catholic Church in France
Religion in the Ancien Régime
Political history of the Ancien Régime
1682 in France
Christianity and law in the 17th century
1682 in Christianity